Al Cielo EP is the second EP by the American heavy metal band Black Tide. It features re-recorded versions of three songs from Post Mortem with Spanish vocals. On the two latter songs, the names are changed to be in Spanish. "Let it Out" and "Into the Sky" are titled "Dejalo Salir" and "Al Cielo" respectively.

Track listing

Personnel
Black Tide
Gabriel Garcia – lead vocals,  lead guitar
Austin Diaz – rhythm guitar, backing vocals
Zakk Sandler – bass, backing vocals
Steven Spence – drums, percussion

References

2011 EPs
Black Tide albums
Interscope Records EPs
Albums produced by Garth Richardson

pt:Post Mortem